Radboud University (abbreviated as RU, formerly Katholieke Universiteit Nijmegen) is a public research university located in Nijmegen, the Netherlands. The university bears the name of Saint Radboud, a 9th century Dutch bishop who was known for his intellect and support of the underprivileged.

Established in 1923, Radboud University has consistently been included in the top 150 of universities in the world by four major university ranking tables. As of 2020, it ranks 105th in the Shanghai Academic Ranking of World Universities. Internationally, RU is known for its strong research output. In 2020, 391 PhD degrees were awarded, and 8,396 scientific articles were published. To bolster the international exchange of academic knowledge, Radboud University joined the Guild of European Research-Intensive Universities in 2016.

Among its alumni Radboud University counts 12 Spinoza Prize laureates and 1 Nobel Prize laureate, Sir Konstantin Novoselov, the discoverer of graphene. Other notable alumni include former Prime Minister of the Netherlands Dries van Agt, former chairman of Unilever Marijn Emmanuel Dekkers, influential priest and theologian Henri Nouwen, and First Vice-President of the European Commission Frans Timmermans. Former students have also won 3 Olympic medals since 2000 (all in rowing).

Coat of arms

Radboud University's coat of arms was designed at the time of the founding of the university by the goldsmith workshop of the Brom family in Utrecht. The lower part represents the coat of arms of the Catholic Church in the Netherlands. The dove in the upper part of the coat of arms is the symbol of the Holy Spirit. The entire shield is surmounted by the Imperial Crown of the Holy Roman Empire because Nijmegen was once home to Frankish King Charlemagne. Underneath the coat of arms one finds the university's motto "In Dei Nomine Feliciter", meaning "happily in the name of God". The coat of arms is used on most of the university's official documents, including the university's bachelor, master and PhD certificates. For 2023 a special version of the coat of arms was designed to celebrate Radboud University's 100 year anniversary.

History 
The establishment of a university in the city of Nijmegen goes far back. The first University of Nijmegen was founded in 1655 as the Kwartierlijke Academie van Nijmegen. Students developed their skills in the traditional fields of theology, medicine and law. Although the university had its successes, the Kwartierlijke Academie terminated around 1680. The university was unable to recover from successive outbreaks of the plague and the French invasion of the Netherlands in 1672.

After several attempts to establish a new university in Nijmegen, the current Radboud University Nijmegen was established in 1923 under the name Katholieke Universiteit Nijmegen (Catholic University of Nijmegen). It was founded by the Saint Radboud Foundation, a network of bishops that wished to emancipate Catholic intellectuals in the Netherlands. At the time, Dutch Roman Catholics were disadvantaged and occupied almost no higher posts in governmental and scientific institutions. The establishment of a university was seen as a possible stepping stone for these individuals.  When the Catholic University of Nijmegen was founded, every student automatically became part of student corporation N.S.V. Carolus Magnus [nl], named after the Frankish king, Charlemagne, who used to reside in Nijmegen in the Middle Ages. This organization was set up to speak for  student needs and to organize an annual induction ceremony. It also aimed at attaining the same status as other corporations in the well-known Dutch student cities of Leiden, Delft and Groningen. To the horror of the Catholic University’s management, Carolus Magnus also pursued the same liberal elitist character as these other corporations. Still, it continued developing and students eagerly participated. In the 1920s it produced its own sociëteiten: male students became part of Gentleman’s Roland Society  (1928) and female students joined the Ladies Society Lumen Ducet (1929). Some students of these sociëteiten banded together in smaller communities called disputen.

University in times of war 
The first years after the establishment of 1923 were quite successful for the Catholic University of Nijmegen, but during the Second World War the young university encountered serious difficulties. Many prominent members were lost, among them the anti-Nazi professors Robert Regout and Titus Brandsma who  were deported to Dachau concentration camp and died there. As the war progressed, the university was more severely curtailed in its freedoms. The German Sicherheitsdienst(security service) removed so-called "anti-German works" from the University library. In addition, professors could only be appointed after approval by the Nazi Department of Education, Science and Cultural Protection. Such measures aimed at eventually eliminatind religious institutions of higher education. There would be no place for a Catholic university in a nazified Netherlands.

In March and April 1943, the conflict with the Nazi occupying forces reached a boiling point. The occupiers demanded that all students in the Netherlands sign a declaration of loyalty. If they did not, they were not allowed to continue their studies and had to work in Germany as forced laborers. However, students in Nijmegen showed to be resistant to the German demands. At the risk of his own life, law student Jozef van Hövelleven launched a widespread campaign to get as many students as possible not to sign. 

The university's rector magnificus at that time, Bernard Hermesdorf, decided to show solidarity with students like Jozef van Hövell. As the only Dutch rector in the Netherlands he refused, for "reasons of principle", to distribute pre-printed loyalty statements to his students. Although heroic, Hermesdorf's refusal led to extreme anger among the occupying Nazi forces. On May 5, 1943, the Germans demanded all Nijmegen's non-signatories of the loyalty statement to report to Ommen within 24 hours to be put to work in Germany. If they did not, their families would be held responsible. These circumstances left rector magnificus Bernard Hermesdorf with no choice but to close the doors of the university as of April 11 1943, pending better times. Eventually, only 83 students decided to report to the Germans in Ommen. Most of the students went into hiding, scattered across the Netherlands. The great spider in the web during that time was university moderator Bernard van Ogtrop, who traveled all over the country to visit students from Nijmegen in hiding. He wrote circulars, took care of a wide-ranging correspondence, and ran a parcel service and thus managed to keep many people's spirits up. The university was closed, but thanks to Van Ogtrop it continued to exist, if only in the minds of the students.

1945 – 2000 
When the war ended in 1944, the university infrastructure had been largely destroyed, but students still returned to their alma mater in dribs and drabs. Classes officially resumed again in March 1945, but because many university buildings had been bombed during the war, a dire need for new facilities existed. With the purchase of the Heyendaal estate, the university got its own campus in a green setting less than a fifteen-minute bike ride from the Nijmegen city center. In 1951, the Faculty of Medical Sciences was the first faculty to move to Heyendaal. Soon, other faculties followed. By 1988, all faculties had moved to Heyendaal. The move to a new campus also with a rise in students attending the Catholic University of Nijmegen. Since the end of the war, student numbers steadily rose from 3,000 in 1960 to 15,000 in 1980.

The period between 1960 and 1975 is often generally described as the "Age of Student Unrest". Not only did the student population in Nijmegen rise exponentially, it had also become more diverse, left-leaning and less elitist. Next to that, the hippie movement had reached the city which caused many students to desire a more democratic student life. Umbrella organization Carolus Magnus became increasingly bloated and lost connection with the members of sociëteiten and disputen that began to operate more independently. It was not the beloved corporation it used to be and students criticized the mandatory membership of Carolus Magnus. Therefore, the organization slowly became more concerned with administrative duties than organizing community activities. In 1966 Carolus Magnus ceased to exist in its traditional sense. From that moment on, students were free to choose which association they joined and which not. In the 1980s and 1990s many other kinds of student associations were established in Nijmegen, including evangelical-christian association Navigators, egalitarian association Ovum Novum, and alternative student association Karpe Noktum.

2000 – now 
In 2004, the university decided to change its name from Catholic University of Nijmegen to the more inclusive name Radboud University Nijmegen, honoring Saint Radboud of Utrecht. Following that decision, the university increasingly struggled with the interference of the Catholic Church. The Church saw the university becoming more secular and refused to accept appointments of non-Catholic individuals to the Radboud Executive Board. As of 15 November 2020, the Bishops' Conference of the Netherlands decided to revoke the designation Catholic from Radboud's supervisory body, meaning that the university is no longer entitled to receive subsidies from the Church and present itself as Roman Catholic.

Faculties 
Radboud University is organized in seven faculties that offer programmes and courses in the fields of humanities, social sciences, natural sciences, medical sciences, law, management, philosophy, theology and religious studies. Each faculty (cf., College in the USA or School in Europe) is a formal grouping of academic degree programmes, schools and institutes, discipline areas, research centres, and/or any combination of these drawn together for educational purposes.

 Faculty of Arts
 Faculty of Law
 Radboud University Medical Centre
 Nijmegen School of Management
 Faculty of Philosophy, Theology and Religious Studies
 Faculty of Science
 Faculty of Social Sciences

Campus

Radboud University is noted for its green campus, often listed among the most attractive in the Netherlands. The campus is located in the southern Heyendaal estate of Nijmegen and houses 7 faculties that conduct teaching and research. In addition to these faculties, the campus also hosts the Max Plank Institute for Psycholinguistics, a world class research centre devoted to the understanding of human language and communication.

Featured prominently on the northwest side of the university's Heyendaal campus is the Heyendaal castle. It borders the Radboud University Medical Center, a large teaching hospital located on the campus, which is linked to the university's medical department. Bordering the university hospital is the Huygens Building, which houses the Faculty of Natural Sciences. At the south end of the campus next to the Radboud Sports Centre (RSC), one finds the Erasmus Tower which houses the Faculty of Arts and Philosophy, Theology and Religion. The Erasmus Tower and the RSC border the Elinor Ostrom building, which is home to the School of Management and also encompasses the political sciences and economics faculty staff. On the other side of the Erasmus Tower, a number of general lecture halls is located along with the campus pub and bookshop. Beyond this area, in the southwest of the campus, one finds the modern Maria Montessori building, home to the Faculty of Social Sciences, and the Grotius building, home to the Faculty of Law. In the most southern part of the campus, the monumental Jesuit Berchmanianum monastery can be found which houses the university's general services staff and will serve as its auditorium

In 2017, a SPAR minimarket was opened in the Erasmus building which provides students with snacks and accessories. The university campus borders the campus of the HAN vocational university, which in turn is located next to Heyendaal train station. Frequent shuttle buses connect the university to Nijmegen Central Station and the city centre.

Academics

Education

Radboud University  enrols over 22.000 students in about one hundred study programs (about 50 bachelor's and 50 master's programs). As of April 2021, the university offers 34 international master's programs taught in English and several more taught in Dutch. There are nine bachelor's programs taught fully in English: American Studies, Artificial Intelligence, Biology, Chemistry, Computing Science, International Economics & Business, International Business Administration, English Language and Culture, Philosophy, Politics and Society and Molecular Life Sciences. Communication and Information Studies, History, Psychology and Arts and Culture Studies offer English-language tracks. All other bachelors are in Dutch, although most of the required literature is in English. Some exams, papers and even classes may be in English as well, despite the programs being Dutch-taught. All master's programs have been internationally accredited by the Accreditation Organization of the Netherlands and Flanders (NVAO).

International master's programs
All English-taught master's programmes are research-based programmes. They are taught within the Faculties of Arts, Law, Social Sciences, Medical Sciences, Sciences and Philosophy, Theology and Religious Studies, besides the Interfaculty Research school and the Nijmegen School of Management.

Research
Radboud University is home to several research institutions, including the Business & Law Research Centre, Institute for Management Research, NanoLab Nijmegen, the Donders Institute for Brain, Cognition and Behaviour and HFML-FELIX. Faculty members Anne Cutler (1999), Henk Barendregt (2002), Peter Hagoort (2005), Theo Rasing (2008), Heino Falcke (2011), Mike Jetten (2012), Ieke Moerdijk (2012), Mikhail Katsnelson (2013), Wilhelm Huck (2016) and Klaas Landsman (2022) won the Spinoza Prize. Visiting professor Sir Andre Geim and former PhD student Sir Konstantin Novoselov were awarded the 2010 Nobel Prize in Physics.

University ranking

Radboud University has been named best broad university in the Netherlands for the past seven consecutive years. The physics department is considered top tier. A recent accomplishment is its contribution to the first picture of a black hole. The Faculty of Law is nationally unrivaled in its research in business and law, and retains strong international ties with other prominent research institutions, such as Bologna, Nice and Oxford. The Faculty of Law's European Law School and Notarial Law departments are considered best in class in the Netherlands, just as the Political Sciences, Sociology and Theology programmes in their respective fields.

Radboud Excellence Initiative
The Radboud Excellence Initiative was created with the dual purposes of attracting talents from every academic field to Radboud University while strengthening international bonds between universities worldwide. The initiative is a joint enterprise of both Radboud University and Radboud University Nijmegen Medical Center. It provides two routes by which a researcher may come to Radboud University. Promising researchers who have completed their doctorate between two and eight years earlier at the time of nomination may be nominated for a fellowship whereas those researchers who are more established in their discipline may be nominated for a professorship.

Student life

Student associations

Radboud University offers students the opportunity to join various ethnic, cultural and political organizations, along with numerous honor societies, special interest groups and socially focused student societies.

Study associations
Lately study associations have overtaken part of the role that student associations like Carolus Magnus used to play. These study associations are related to individual degree programs and are open to international students as well. Study associations don’t have initiation rituals and regularly meet for fun-related, as well as study-related activities. Some examples of study associations are the study association for history students (Excalibur), the study association for psychology students (SPIN), and the study association for Business Administration students (Synergy).

Campus publications 
Radboud University's independent university media platform, Vox, intended for students and staff, publishes daily material online and delivers hard copy magazines every month. Its paper magazine is distributed on campus for free. Students at Radboud University also produce an independent student magazine that appears seven times a year: the Algemeen Nijmeegs Studentenblad (ANS).

Athletics 
Radboud University offers many facilities for sports at the Radboud Sports Centre (RSC) a part of campus where students are welcomed 7 days a week to partake in a variety of at least 80 different sports. In addition to the facilities of the Radboud Sports Centre, Radboud University also boasts more than 35 student sports associations such as the Radboud Rangers (baseball), Obelix (rugby), Apelliotes (hockey), FC Kunde (soccer), Phocas (rowing) and De Loefbijter (sailing).

Notable alumni

The following is a partial list of notable alumni of Radboud University:

Politics 
Gracita Arrindell – first woman President of Sint Maarten.
Louis Beel (1928, LLM) – 36th Prime Minister of the Netherlands
Jo Cals (1940, LLM) – 41st Prime Minister of the Netherlands 
Thom de Graaf (1981, LLM) – former mayor of Nijmegen
Loek Hermans (1976, MSc) – former Dutch Minister of Education, Culture and Science
Agnes Kant (1989, MSc & 1997, PhD) – former leader of the Dutch Socialist Party
Gerd Leers, (1976, MSc) – former mayor of Maastricht, Minister for Immigration and Asylum Affairs
Victor Marijnen (1941, LLM) – 39th Prime Minister of the Netherlands
Lilian Marijnissen (2006, MSc) – leader of the Dutch Socialist Party
Frans Timmermans (1985, MA) – Dutch politician and diplomat who currently serves as the First Vice-President of the European Commission and the European Commissioner for the portfolio of Better Regulation, Inter-Institutional Relations, Rule of Law and Charter of Fundamental Rights in the Juncker Commission.
Dries van Agt (1955, LLM) – 46th Prime Minister of the Netherlands
Jos van der Lans (1981, MA) – former member of the Dutch House of Representatives
Ingrid van Engelshoven (1989, MSc) – Dutch Minister of Education, Culture and Science
Hans van Mierlo (1960, LLM) – former Dutch Minister of Foreign Affairs
Rita Verdonk (1983, MA) – former Dutch Minister for Immigration and Asylum Affairs, former member of the Dutch House of Representatives

Academics 

 Anna Akhmanova (1999, PhD) – cell biologist and winner of the 2018 Spinoza Prize
 Wim Crusio (1984, PhD) – neurobehavioural geneticist
 Frans de Waal (1970, MSc) – biologist and primatologist known for his work on the behavior and social intelligence of primates.
 Jos Engelen (1973, MSc & 1979, PhD) – experimental physicist
 Halleh Ghorashi (2001, PhD) – Iranian-born anthropologist, member of the Royal Netherlands Academy of Arts and Sciences
 Sir Konstantin Novoselov (PhD) – discoverer of graphene, awarded 2010 Nobel Prize in Physics
 Harald E.L. Prins (1976, BA) anthropologist, ethnohistorian, documentary filmmaker and expert witness on indigenous rights in United States and Canadian courts, distinguished Professor of Anthropology at Kansas State University

Business 

 Marijn Emmanuel Dekkers, (1979, BSc) – Chief Executive Officer of Bayer (2010–2016) and Unilever (2016–2019)
 Aart Jan de Geus (1981, LMM) – Chief Executive Officer of the Bertelsmann Stiftung and chairman of the Triodos Bank
 Louis Reijtenbagh (1975, MSc) – founder and Chief Executive Officer of The Plaza Group
 Herna Verhagen, (1988, LLM)  – Chief Executive Officer of PostNL, most influential Dutch woman 2014

Sports 

Karapet Karapetyan (2011, LLM) – Armenian-Dutch kickboxer, ranked #3 welterweight in the world in November 2015 by GLORY
Björn Kuipers (2001, MSc) – football referee, leader of multiple UEFA Europa League finals and the 2014 UEFA Champions League Final
Koen Metsemakers (2019, MSc) – rower, winner of a golden medal in the men's quad scull in the 2020 Summer Olympics in Tokyo, Japan
Nelleke Penninx (1998, MSc) – rower, winner of a silver medal in the women's eight with coxswain in the 2000 Summer Olympics in Sydney, Australia
Annemarieke van Rumpt (2004, MSc) – rower, winner of a bronze medal in the women's four coxless in the 2004 Summer Olympics in Milan, Italy

Literature 
 Godfried Bomans (1943, not completed) – popular Dutch author, famous for his children fantasy novel "Eric in the Land of the Insects"
 Henri Nouwen (1964, MSc) – Catholic priest and writer, most known for his book "The Return of the Prodigal Son"
 Mark Retera (1989, MSc) – popular Dutch cartoonist, best known for his absurd gag comic DirkJan
 A. F. Th. van der Heijden (1976, BA) – popular Dutch author, most known for his multi-novel saga De tandeloze tijd ("The Toothless Time")

Notable faculty

The following is a partial list of notable faculty of Radboud University:

 Hans van Abeelen, first Dutch behaviour geneticist
 Titus Brandsma †, co-founder, murdered in Dachau concentration camp
 Ap Dijksterhuis, social psychologist and author of "Het slimme onbewuste"
 Heino Falcke, German professor of radio astronomy and astroparticle physics
 Carlos Gussenhoven, professor of linguistics, specializes in phonetics and phonology
 Catharina Halkes, first feminist theologian to be a professor in the Netherlands
 Renate Loll, physicist, developed the theory of Causal Dynamical Triangulations.
 Jos van der Meer, professor of general internal medicine
 Willem Duynstee, Rector (1940/1941), Philosophical Psychology (Mortification Therapy), Lawyer, and Moral Theologian
 Mihai Netea, physician, awarded the Spinoza Prize of 2016
 Kees Versteegh, professor emeritus of Middle Eastern studies, also alumnus
 Roos Vonk, social psychologist and author of several popular scientific works such as "De eerste indruk" and "Je bent wat je doet"
 Jan van der Watt, expert in Johannine literature, General editor of Review of Biblical Literature

See also
 Hogeschool van Arnhem en Nijmegen, a University of Applied Sciences located in Nijmegen and Arnhem
 List of early modern universities in Europe

Notes

References

External links

 

 
Universities in the Netherlands
Educational institutions established in 1923
1923 establishments in the Netherlands
Organisations based in Gelderland
Catholic universities and colleges in the Netherlands
Buildings and structures in Nijmegen
Education in Nijmegen